The Western and Franklin Avenue Line was a Pacific Electric streetcar line which traveled from Los Angeles to Hollywood. It operated from 11th and Hill Streets via Hill, Sunset, Santa Monica Boulevard, Western Avenue, Franklin Avenue, Argyle Avenue, Yucca Street, and Vine Street to end at Hollywood and Vine Boulevards. It operated from 1908 to 1940. The Brush Canyon Line branched from this line at Bronson.

History
Tracks on Western and Franklin were built by the Los Angeles Pacific Railroad in 1908 and were converted to standard gauge only a month after completion. Double tracking on Western Avenue was completed in 1910 and the line was acquired by Pacific Electric in 1911 as part of the Great Merger.

Some outbound trips continued west on Hollywood Boulevard to terminate at the West Hollywood station following PE's acquisition, though this ended by 1912. Between February 1922 and July 1924 the route operated as a shuttle service between Santa Monica/Western and Hollywood/Vine. Service was suspended from July 1924 to the following January owing to power issues throughout the system. Through-routing to the downtown terminal was reestablished upon resumption of service, though it had been reduced to rush hours only by October 1932 and the line was through-routed with the Venice Boulevard Local. Cars were terminating at Hill and 11th by 1935, and shuttle service on the outer segment of the line returned in 1938.

Service was discontinued on March 17, 1940.

See also
Streetcar suburb
Streetcars in North America
List of California railroads
History of rail transportation in California

References

External links

Electric Railway Historical Association of Southern California

History of Los Angeles
Light rail in California
Pacific Electric routes
Railway lines opened in 1908
1908 establishments in California
Railway lines closed in 1950
1950 disestablishments in California
Closed railway lines in the United States